Cleonae or Cleonæ or Kleonai may refer to:

Cleonae (Argolis), a city of ancient Argolis, Greece, now in Corinthia, Greece
Cleonae (Chalcidice), a city of ancient Chalcidice, on Mount Athos, Greece
Cleonae (Phocis), a town of ancient Phocis, Greece